The Northern New York League was a Minor League Baseball circuit that operated in a span of six seasons between 1900 and 1905. League franchises were located in New York and Vermont. For the majority of its existence it operated as an independent league, except in 1902, when was classified as Class D circuit. In 1906, the league changed names to the Northern Independent League as Ottawa joined Burlington, Montpelier-Barre, Plattsburgh and Rutland in the league.

Cities represented and teams
 Burlington, VT - Burlington (1903–05)	
 Canton, NY - Canton (1901)
 Gouverneur, NY - Gouverneur (1900)
 Malone, NY - Malone (1900–02)
Montpelier, VT / Barre, VT – Montpelier-Barre (1904–05)
 Ogdensburg, NY - Ogdensburg (1900–01)
 Plattsburgh, NY - Plattsburgh (1901–05)
 Potsdam, NY - Potsdam (1900–02)
 Rutland, VT - Rutland (1903–05)
 St. Albans, VT - St. Albans (1902–04)

MLB alumni

Sources
Baseball Reference - Northern New York League Encyclopedia and History

References

Baseball leagues in New York (state)
Defunct minor baseball leagues in the United States
Defunct baseball teams in New York (state)
Baseball leagues in Vermont
Sports leagues established in 1900
Sports leagues disestablished in 1905